"100%" is a song by Swedish singer Victor och Natten. The song was released in Sweden as a digital download on 28 February 2016, and was written by Dag Lundberg, Melker, and Jesper Lundh. It took part in Melodifestivalen 2016, and placed sixth in the second semi-final.

Track listing

Charts

Weekly charts

Release history

References

2015 songs
2016 singles
Melodifestivalen songs of 2016
Victor och Natten songs
Swedish pop songs
Swedish-language songs